Palawan's 1st congressional district is one of the three congressional districts of the Philippines in the province of Palawan. It has been represented in the House of Representatives since 1987. The district encompasses the northern portion of Palawan Island including the Calamianes, Cuyo and Kalayaan island chains. It consists of the municipalities of Agutaya, Araceli, Busuanga, Cagayancillo, Coron, Culion, Cuyo, Dumaran, El Nido, Kalayaan, Linapacan, Magsaysay, Roxas, San Vicente and Taytay. The district is currently represented in the 19th Congress by Edgardo Salvame of the People's Reform Party (PRP).

Representation history

Election results

2019

2016

2013

2010

See also
Legislative districts of Palawan

References

Congressional districts of the Philippines
Politics of Palawan
1987 establishments in the Philippines
Congressional districts of Mimaropa
Constituencies established in 1987